The 2020 Maldivian FA Charity Shield, (commonly known as the 2020 Milo Charity Shield due to sponsorship reasons) is the 11th Maldivian FA Charity Shield, an annual Maldivian football match played between the winners of the previous season's Dhivehi Premier League and FA Cup. The game was played between Maziya, champions of the 2020–21 Dhivehi Premier League, and runner-up Eagles, as the 2020 Maldives FA Cup  was cancelled and declared null and void due to the outbreak of COVID-19 pandemic in the Maldives.

This was the sixth appearance of Maziya in the FA Charity Shield, and debut appearance for Club Eagles. Maziya won thrice continuously in 2015, 2016 and 2017.

Background

Match

Details

Notes

References

Maldivian FA Charity Shield
Char